The Fiat A.55 was a seven-cylinder, air-cooled radial engine developed in Italy in the 1930s as a powerplant for aircraft.

Specifications

See also

References

A.55
1930s aircraft piston engines